Hidenori (written: 秀典, 秀憲, 秀則, 秀徳, 英則, 英徳 or 英智) is a masculine Japanese given name. Notable people with the name include:

, Japanese sound effects editor
, Japanese manga artist
, Japanese ice hockey player
, Japanese biathlete
, Japanese footballer
, Japanese video game composer
, Japanese footballer
, Japanese baseball player
, Japanese manga artist
, Japanese footballer
, Japanese cyclist
, Japanese video game composer
, Japanese voice actor
, Japanese baseball player
, Japanese actor and singer
, Japanese composer and musician

Japanese masculine given names